A penumbral lunar eclipse took place on Wednesday, October 16, 1940, the last of three lunar eclipses in 1940.

Visibility

Related lunar eclipses

Half-Saros cycle
A lunar eclipse will be preceded and followed by solar eclipses by 9 years and 5.5 days (a half saros). This lunar eclipse is related to two partial solar eclipses of Solar Saros 152.

See also
List of lunar eclipses
List of 20th-century lunar eclipses

Notes

External links

1940-10
1940 in science